Paradise Drifters is a 2020 Dutch film directed by Mees Peijnenburg. The film premiered at the 2020 International Film Festival Rotterdam.

Bilal Wahib won the Golden Calf for Best Supporting Actor award for his role in the film. Jonas Smulders was also nominated for the Golden Calf for Best Actor award for his role in the film. Jasper Wolf was also nominated for the Golden Calf for Best Camera award.

References

External links 
 

2020 films
2020 drama films
2020s Dutch-language films
Dutch drama films